The 2008–09 Fenerbahçe S.K. season was the club's 51st consecutive season in the Süper Lig and their 101st year in existence. They also competed in the UEFA Champions League, starting the competition in the group stage.

Kits

Team squad

Current squad

Transfers

Pre-season friendlies

Süper Lig

UEFA Champions League
All times are EET

2nd qualifying round

3rd qualifying round

Group stage

Turkish Cup

All times are EET

Group stage

Quarter-final

Semi-final

Final

References

Fenerbahçe S.K. (football) seasons
Fenerbahce